"Electrical Storm" is a song by Irish rock band U2. It is the fourth track on their second greatest hits compilation album, The Best of 1990–2000, and was released as a single on 21 October 2002. "Electrical Storm" is one of two new songs that were recorded for the compilation (the other one being "The Hands That Built America"). Two versions of the song were released: the "Band Version", produced by Carl Glanville; and the "William Orbit Mix", produced by William Orbit. The music video for the song prominently features drummer Larry Mullen Jr. and actress Samantha Morton. The lyrics were written by the band's lead vocalist Bono about two quarreling lovers and the tension between them; he relates this to a looming electrical storm. U2 did not perform the song live until 2 July 2009, on the second concert of their U2 360° Tour in Barcelona, Spain.

Although the song did not chart well in the United States, reaching only number 77 on the US Billboard Hot 100, it performed well elsewhere; it reached number one in Canada, Italy, and Spain, as well as the top ten in Australia, Austria, Denmark, Finland, Germany, Ireland, the Netherlands, New Zealand, Norway, Scotland, and Switzerland. It also peaked at number five on the UK Singles Chart, and at number 14 and 26 on the US Alternative Songs and Mainstream Rock charts, respectively.

Composition
Two official versions of the song exist – the "Band Version" mixed by Carl Glanville, and the "William Orbit Mix" mixed by William Orbit and featuring a much quieter intro. The "William Orbit Mix" appeared on The Best of 1990–2000 and the "Band Version" was featured on the B-sides disc of the album.

Shortly before the official release of the single, a third version of the song was broadcast on radio stations in the United Kingdom, Australia and Latin America. Unofficially called the "Radio One Mix" (because it was originally played on BBC Radio 1, and in the middle of the song said station's call sign is heard), this version is a very-mellow sounding mix, with different guitar lines during the chorus and traditional U2 "chiming" riff at the start of the guitar solo towards the end of the song. It is believed this was a demo version that was leaked to radio.

Live performances
The song was rehearsed during the Vertigo Tour, but did not make it to a full show until the U2 360° Tour when it was played in the William Orbit style during the tour's second night in Barcelona, Spain on 2 July 2009. It was subsequently played twice more: on 8 July 2009 in Milan, Italy and on 1 August 2009 in Gothenburg, Sweden.

Formats and track listings

Personnel
 Bono – lead vocals, guitar
 The Edge – guitar, backing vocals, keyboards
 Adam Clayton – bass guitar
 Larry Mullen Jr. – drums

Charts

Weekly charts

Year-end charts

Release history

See also
 List of number-one singles of 2002 (Canada)
 List of number-one hits of 2002 (Italy)
 List of number-one singles of 2002 (Spain)

References

2002 singles
Black-and-white music videos
Canadian Singles Chart number-one singles
Interscope Records singles
Island Records singles
Music videos directed by Anton Corbijn
Number-one singles in Italy
Number-one singles in Portugal
Number-one singles in Spain
Rock ballads
Songs written by Adam Clayton
Songs written by Bono
Songs written by the Edge
Songs written by Larry Mullen Jr.
U2 songs
Songs containing the I–V-vi-IV progression